Keep It Trill is a song by rapper and singer Kirko Bangz. It is the first single off of his upcoming debut album Bigger Than Me. The song was released on November 30, 2012 by Warner Bros. Records. The music video was directed by Benny Boom and released on March 1, 2013.

Chart performance
The song peaked at number 49 on the Hot R&B/Hip-Hop Songs chart.

References

2012 singles
2012 songs
Kirko Bangz songs
Warner Records singles
Music videos directed by Benny Boom
Songs written by Bob Robinson (songwriter)
Songs written by Tim Kelley